Ladies of the House is a television movie made-for-TV movie that aired on Hallmark Channel in October 2008.  It stars Florence Henderson, Donna Mills, and Pam Grier.

Plot
A house owned by a church to be sold to fund the day care center's need of major remodeling.  The pastor enlists three women to take on the project: Birdie, Rose, and Elizabeth.  Initially they want to hire someone to do it all, but as their budget is limited, they realize they must to do it themselves.  As they remodel the decrepit house, Elizabeth (Donna Mills) discovers her marriage is over, Birdie (Pam Grier) deals with her husband's retirement, and Rose (Florence Henderson) copes with the news that her husband (Lance Henriksen), has been diagnosed with cancer.  They also make unlikely friendships with men at the local hardware store, and their intimidating neighbor, Junior.

Cast
 Florence Henderson as Rose Olmstead
 Donna Mills as Elizabeth Waldman
 Pam Grier as Roberta "Birdie" Marchand
 Lance Henriksen as Frank Olmstead
 Gordon Thomson as Richard Waldman
 Michael Ensign as Pastor Wesley
 Richard Roundtree as Stan Marchand
 Lobo Sebastian as Junior

Reception
Ladies of the House did fairly well for Hallmark Channel: it received a 1.9 household rating and delivered over 1.6 million homes and 2.9 million total viewers on the day of its premiere, ranking it as the second-highest-rated ad-supported cable movie of the week and boosting the network to rank sixth in Prime Time for the day.  The movie also doubled their October-to-date Prime Time rating among women between the ages of 25-54.

External links

Ladies of the House on Hallmark Channel
Ladies of the House on Hallmark Channel's press site

References

Hallmark Channel original films
2008 television films
2008 films
Films directed by James A. Contner